Rotylenchus brachyurus is a plant pathogenic nematode infecting African violets.

References

External links 
 Nemaplex, University of California - Rotylenchus

Tylenchida
Ornamental plant pathogens and diseases
Plant pathogenic nematodes